Mikhil Musale is a film director from India. In 2010, he founded the film production and distribution company, CineMan Productions, with Abhishek Jain and Anish Shah. Wrong Side Raju is his first film as a director and it won the National Film Award for Best Feature Film in Gujarati at the 64th National Film Awards. In 2019, he debuted in the Bollywood film industry with Made in China, starring Rajkummar Rao, Boman Irani and Mouni Roy.

Filmography

See also
 CineMan Productions

References

External links
 
 

Living people
Hindi-language film directors
Gujarati-language film directors
21st-century Indian film directors
Year of birth missing (living people)